Kindred the Family Soul, also referred to as simply Kindred, is an American neo soul duo consisting of married couple Fatin Dantzler (born in 1973 in Camden, New Jersey) and Aja Graydon (born September 25, 1978 in Los Angeles, California). Signed to Hidden Beach Recordings, Kindred emerged from the Philadelphia neo soul movement that also includes Jill Scott, who introduced them to her then label president Steve McKeever of Hidden Beach Recordings while the couple was performing at the Black Lily Showcase in Philly weekly back in 2000. Kindred would go on to sign their first recording contract with the label.

After two years of work on the CD, Hidden Beach issued their debut album Surrender to Love in February 2003, which included the single "Far Away". Their follow-up album was 2005's In This Life Together—its title being a reference to Ossie Davis and Ruby Dee's 1998 book With Ossie & Ruby: In This Life Together—, spawning the single "Where Would I Be (The Question)".

The duo were nominated for a Soul Train Music Award for Best R&B/Soul Album, Group Band or Duo for Surrender to Love in 2004 and a BET Award for the BET J Cool Like That Award in 2006.  The group's third LP, The Arrival, was released on October 21, 2008. In 2011 the group released the LP Love Has No Recession, which featured many guest artists including the late Chuck Brown, Snoop Dogg, Raheem Devaughn, BJ the Chicago Kid, and Bilal. That record spawned the top 40 Urban AC single "Magic Happens". In 2014, the group released A Couple Friends. In 2016, they released Legacy Of Love which includes the hit single “All My People”. Kindred is currently preparing to release new Music in the year 2020 also hugely focused on their interview and performing series Kindred Presents. In 2021, they released "Auntie & Unc" which features their single "Break It Down".

Discography

Albums

Singles

References

External links

Kindred the Family Soul on the Hidden Beach Recordings website

African-American musicians
African-American musical groups
Contemporary R&B duos
American musical duos
Married couples
Family musical groups
Musical groups established in 2002
American neo soul singers
Musical groups from Philadelphia
American soul musical groups
2002 establishments in Pennsylvania
Ballad music groups
Male–female musical duos